Lucier is a French surname that derives from the name Lussier. Notable people with the name include:

Alvin Lucier (born 1931), American composer
Étienne Lucier (1793–1853), fur trader in what is now the Pacific Northwest
James P. Lucier, an author, and former staff member of the United States Senate
Mary Lucier (born 1944), American artist 
Lou Lucier (1918–2014), Major League Baseball pitcher
Paul Lucier (1930–1999), Canadian politician
Wayne Lucier (born 1979), former American football center and guard for the New York Giants from 2003 to 2005
Margie Lucier (born 1992) A Canadian artist / painter

References